Unseen Enemies is a 1926 American silent Western film directed by J.P. McGowan and starring Al Hoxie and Claire Anderson.

Cast
 Al Hoxie as 'Happened-Along' Meredith 
 Claire Anderson as Doris Davenport
 Catherine Craig as Laura Stribling
 Bob Kortman as 'Bingo' Strook
 Max Asher as 'Doughnut' Casey
 Bud Gildebrand as First Davenport Boy
 Clayton Gildebrand as Second Davenport Boy
 Mack V. Wright as Henchman

References

Bibliography
 Langman, Larry. A Guide to Silent Westerns. Greenwood Publishing Group, 1992.
 McGowan, John J. J.P. McGowan: Biography of a Hollywood Pioneer. McFarland, 2005.

External links
 

1926 films
1926 Western (genre) films
American black-and-white films
Films directed by J. P. McGowan
Silent American Western (genre) films
1920s English-language films
1920s American films